ㅜ (u) is one of the Korean hangul. The Unicode for ㅜ is U+315C.

Stroke order

Hangul jamo
Vowel letters